The siege of Astorga of 1812 took place between 29 June and 19 August 1812, at Astorga, León, Castile-León, Spain, during the Peninsular War.

Background
The French autumn counterattack started with the Siege of Astorga.

Siege
On 29 June, the Spanish troops of Lieutenant-General Francisco Gómez de Terán y Negrete, Marquess of Portago, started the operations, and laid siege to Astorga. The siege was part of the Allied offensive in the summer of 1812. The Spanish VI Army led by General José María Santocildes, by order of General Francisco Castaños, take the measures necessary for the recovery of Astorga. On 18 August, after a hard resistance, the French garrison surrendered to the Spaniards. During the siege, part of the Spanish troops marched towards Salamanca to join the Allied army under Arthur Wellesley, commanded by General Santocildes, and contributed successfully in the campaign with the capture of Tordesillas, blocking Toro and Zamora, and occupying Valladolid.

Aftermath
The French autumn counterattack proceeded with the Siege of Burgos.

See also
 Siege of Astorga 1810
 Battle of Salamanca

Notes

References

Further reading

External links
 

Sieges of the Napoleonic Wars
Sieges of the Peninsular War
Battles in Castile and León
Conflicts in 1812
Sieges involving France
Sieges involving Spain
1812 in Spain
June 1812 events
July 1812 events
August 1812 events
Astorga, Spain
History of the province of León